V18 or V-18 may refer to:

V18 engine, a type of internal combustion engine
De Havilland Canada V-18, a type of aircraft